Erven T. Nelson (born 1956) is an American lawyer and politician. He served as a Republican member of the Nevada Assembly from 2014 to 2016.

Early life
Erven T. Nelson was born in 1956 in Washington, D.C.

Nelson was educated at Clark High School in Las Vegas, Nevada. He graduated from Brigham Young University, where he received a bachelor of arts degree in political science. He received a juris doctor from BYU's J. Reuben Clark Law School.

Career
Nelson is a lawyer. He was a law clerk to United States District Judge Roger D. Foley from 1983 to 1984. He has been a member of the Nevada Bar Association since 1987. He serves as a shareholder of the World Services Group. He is a member of the Federalist Society, the Mortgage Bankers Association and the American Bankruptcy Institute.

Nelson served as a Republican member of the Nevada Assembly. He has proposed a bill to amend the Constitution of Nevada with Voter ID requirements. Additionally, he has indicated he would be willing to cast a vote in favor of non-discrimination bills for LGBT Nevadans.

Personal life
With his wife Lisa, he has seven children. He is a member of the Church of Jesus Christ of Latter-day Saints.

References

Living people
1956 births
People from Washington, D.C.
Politicians from Las Vegas
Brigham Young University alumni
J. Reuben Clark Law School alumni
Nevada lawyers
Republican Party members of the Nevada Assembly
American Latter Day Saints